Tuatha na Gael is the debut studio album by the Irish celtic metal band Cruachan released in 1995. In 2001, Hammerheart Records reissued the album with three bonus tracks.

Track listing

"I Am Tuan" also appears on the band's eighth album Nine Years of Blood.
"Erinsong" also appears on the band's fourth album Pagan.
"Óró sé do bheatha abhaile" also appears on the band's second album The Middle Kingdom.

Personnel
Keith Fay - vocals, guitars, mandolin, bodhrán
Leon Bias - guitars, mandolin, bouzouki
John Clohessy - bass
Collete O'Fathaigh - keyboards
John O' Fathaigh - Irish flute, tin whistle, low whistle
Jay O'Niell - drums, percussion

Additional personnel
Paul Kerns - backing vocals on "The First Battle of Moytura" and "Cúchulainn"
Niamh Hanlon - uilleann pipes

References

Cruachan (band) albums
1995 debut albums